Rowshanavand (also Romanized as Rowshanāvand and Rūshnāvand; also known as Roshanābad, Roshanābād, and Rowshanābād) is a village in Fasharud Rural District, in the Central District of Birjand County, South Khorasan Province, Iran. At the 2006 census, its population was 197, in 79 families.

References 

Populated places in Birjand County